Through The Sparks is a Birmingham, Alabama-based psychedelic/folk rock band formed in 2003.  The band received critical success following the release of their first full-length LP, Lazarus Beach, in 2007.  Their sound is often characterized by lush instrumentation and precise arrangements.  The band utilizes both traditional instruments and a variety of electric pianos, guitars, organs, eccentric percussion, horns and synthesizers.

  Until the March 2016 release of Transindifference (Communicating Vessels), Through the Sparks had remained on the independent label, Skybucket Records for their entire catalog which initiated with the EP, Coin Toss EP in 2005, followed by a limited edition collection of early demos called Audio Iotas: Scraps for the Human Ear later that year.  The band's full-length records on Skybucket Records are Lazarus Beach released in 2007 and Worm Moon Waning released in 2010.

Almanac - MMX - Year of Beasts, "a collection of 12 singles released over the course of 2010, monthly," was released June 21, 2011.  A year later Through The Sparks released the Alamalibu EP, named for their East Birmingham, Alabama recording studio, on June 19, 2012.Alamalibu EP featured the single and video 'Angel Fix.'  A career spanning retrospective collection of live recordings, live-in-the-studio recordings, remixes and previously unreleased material titled Invisible Kids - was released digitally in January 2014.

On March 18, 2016, Through the Sparks released their 3rd full-length album, Transindifference.

In late 2016, Through the Sparks released a digitally distributed single titled Meteors in Gorges which was produced by Birmingham-based producer Daniel Farris at the Communicating Vessels recording studio and HQ.  The single featured a large group of female backing vocalists who were prominent Birmingham musicians and artists.

In 2018, Through the Sparks released their entire catalog on their bandcamp site, which included previously unreleased (or out of print) recordings.

Discography

Extended plays

Collections

Studio albums

Appearances on Other Compilations

References

External links
 Facebook
 Bandcamp Site
 Communicating Vessels, (Record Label)
 Feature on Birmingham Music Scene
 Jody Nelson "Birmingham Sessions" performance

American psychedelic rock music groups